The family Pomatiidae is a taxonomic family of small operculate land snails, terrestrial gastropod mollusks that can be found over the warmer parts of the Old World. In the older literature, this family is designated as Pomatiasidae.

This family is a lineage closely related to the Littorinidae (periwinkles) common in coastal habitat. They have adapted to terrestrial life and are thus sometimes called "land winkles".

They are defined by a chalky operculum at the rear end of the body, the shape of their thick shell and their mouth and a characteristic spiral sculpture. The sexes are separate and can sometimes be recognised because the female shell is slightly larger than the male shell.

Taxonomy 

According to the Taxonomy of the Gastropoda (Bouchet & Rocroi, 2005), the family Pomatiidae consisted of two subfamilies:
subfamily Pomatiinae Newton, 1891 (1828) - synonyms: Cyclostomatidae Menke, 1828; Cyclotopsinae Kobelt & Möllendorff, 1898; Ericiidae Wenz, 1915
subfamily Annulariinae  Henderson & Bartsch, 1941, 1920: this subfamily has been raised to the rank of family Annulariidae.

Genera 
Genera within the family Pomatiidae include:
 † Anapomatias Hrubesch, 1965 
 † Bauxia Caziot, 1891 
 † Bembridgia P. Fischer, 1885
 Chondrothyrella Torre and Bartsch, 1938 
 Cinnabarica Neubert, 2009
 Clatripoma Neubert, 2009
 Cyclostoma Lamarck, 1899
 Cyclotopsis Blanford, 1864
 Dioscopoma Neubert, 2009
 † Dissostoma Cossmann, 1888 
 Ericia Partiot, 1848: synonym of Pomatias S. Studer, 1789
 Georgia Bourguignat, 1882: synonym of Socotora Pallary, 1925
 Guillainia Crosse, 1884
 Leonia Gray, 1850
 Lithidion Gray, 1850
 † Omanitopsis Harzhauser & Neubauer, 2016 
 † Palaeocyclotus P. Fischer, 1885 
 Platypoma Neubert, 2009
 Pomatias Studer, 1789 - type genus of the family Pomatiidae
 † Procyclotopsis Wenz, 1924 
 Rochebrunia Bourguignat, 1881
 Socotora Pallary, 1925
 Tropidophora Troschel, 1847
 Tudorella Fischer, 1885

References

Further reading 
 Bartsch P. (1946). "The operculate land mollusks of the family Annulariidae of the Island of Hispaniola and the Bahama Archipelago". United States National Museum Bulletin No. 192, 264 pp., 38 pls.
 
 Watters G. T. (2006). The Caribbean Land Snail Family Annulariidae: A revision of the higher taxa and a catalog of the species. 1-557, figs 1-10, map 1-56, Appendix A: 1-3. Backhuys Publishers, Leiden.

External links